"I'm Gonna Love Her for Both of Us" is a single by Meat Loaf released in 1981. It is from the album Dead Ringer.

Record World said that "Meat comes roaring to the rescue of a mistreated woman."

Track listing 
 "I'm Gonna Love Her for Both of Us"
 "Everything Is Permitted"

Charts

References

Meat Loaf songs
1981 singles
Songs written by Jim Steinman
1981 songs
Epic Records singles
Song recordings with Wall of Sound arrangements